Bhupinder Singh Hooda (born 15 September 1947) is an Indian National Congress politician who is the current Leader of the Opposition in Haryana Legislative Assembly. He also served as the Chief Minister of Haryana from 2005 to 2014.

When he began a second term in October 2009 after leading the Congress to an election victory, it was the first time since 1972 that a Haryana electorate returned a ruling party back to power. Hooda is also a Member of the Bar Council of Punjab and Haryana. In 2010, Indian Prime Minister Manmohan Singh constituted the Working Group on Agriculture Production under Hooda's chairmanship to recommend strategies and action plan for increasing agricultural production and productivity, including long-term policies to ensure sustained agricultural growth.

Early life
Bhupinder Singh Hooda was born to Chaudhary Ranbir Singh Hooda and Har devi Hooda at the Sanghi village in Rohtak district of Haryana. His father Ranbir Singh Hooda was a renowned freedom fighter.

He is an alumnus of Sainik School, Balachadi, Jamnagar, Gujarat. He did his B.A. at Panjab University, Chandigarh after which he pursued law from the prestigious Faculty of Law, University of Delhi. He started his political career at Youth Congress.

Political career
Chaudhry Bhupinder Singh Hooda was elected as a member of parliament from Rohtak Lok Sabha segment for four terms in 1991, 1996, 1998, 2004. He also remained the Leader of Opposition in Haryana Legislative Assembly from 2001 to 2004. He also served as the President of HPCC (Haryana Pradesh Congress Committee) from 1996 to 2001. In three consecutive Lok Sabha elections of 1991, 96 & 98, he defeated Ch. Devi Lal in electoral battles fought in the Jat heartland of Rohtak in Haryana.
He attended international Conferences like World Youth Festival in USSR, World Parliamentary Conference in China, International Conference in USSR as a delegate of AICC and OISCA and International Conferences in Japan and South Korea. Hooda was a vocal supporter for structural reforms within the Congress party and a part of the G23 rebel leaders group. He has been meeting party senior leaders and other G23 leaders to bring about reconciliation.

He is also President, All India Young Farmers' Association, Haryana ; Ex-Member, Market Committee, Rohtak; Director, Bank of India, 1989–92; Secretary, Farmers' Parliamentary Forum, 1991 onwards; Founder-Member and Working President of All India Freedom Fighters' Successors' Organisation; Working President, National Federation Railway Porters, Vendors and Bearers. Elected as a President for the Khadi & Village Industries Commission Employees Union & Patron for the National Khadi & Village Industries Board's Employees Federation – an apex body of all State K&V.I Board's Employees Unions.

To encourage youngsters to pick up Olympic sports, Hooda announced a cash award of Rs 25 million for the state athletes who would win gold medal in any discipline at the London Games. Cash prize money of Rs 15 million and Rs 10 million for silver and bronze medal winners has also been announced. Hooda has come under the scanner of the CBI for alleged misappropriation of funds and scams. In 2019, CBI's preliminary inquiry (PE) has revealed that Hooda and TC Gupta, a 1987 batch IAS officer and the then head of the town and planning department, allegedly hatched a criminal conspiracy with private builders to deliberately notify huge chunks of land in various sectors of Gurgaon for acquisition for public purpose. This led to the landowners selling their lands at throwaway prices to private builders. But the government ended up actually acquiring only a small proportion of these notified land tracts.

Personal life
Bhupinder Singh Hooda married Asha Dahiya in 1976. He has two children. His son Deepender Singh Hooda was the MP of Rohtak from 2004 to 2019.

Positions held

Position held in Pradesh Congress Committee

Government of Haryana

Electoral History

Lok Sabha

Haryana Legislative Assembly

Criticism and scam cases
There are many cases filed against him including six CBI cases and several other vigilance department investigations against Hooda underway. Central Bureau of Investigation is investigating several scams, mostly related to illegal land grab, that took place during his rule in Haryana. These investigations include the Gurugram-Manesar IMT land scam, Robert Vadra DLF land grab scam, Gurugram Rajiv Gandhi Trust land grab scam, Sonepat-Kharkhoda IMT land scam case, Garhi Sampla Uddar Gagan land scam, Panchkula-HUDA Industrial plots allotment scam, AJL-National Herald Panchkula land grab scam, Haryana Forestry scam case and Haryana Raxil drug purchase scam. He has been already chargesheeted in the Manesar-Gurugram land scam, while other cases are still under investigation (c. March 2018).

See also
 List of chief ministers of Haryana
 First Hooda ministry
 Dynastic politics of Haryana

References

|-

|-

1947 births
Living people
Chief Ministers of Haryana
Panjab University alumni
Lok Sabha members from Haryana
India MPs 1991–1996
India MPs 1996–1997
India MPs 1998–1999
India MPs 2004–2009
People from Rohtak district
Leaders of the Opposition in Haryana
Haryana MLAs 2000–2005
Haryana MLAs 2005–2009
Haryana MLAs 2009–2014
Haryana MLAs 2014–2019
Haryana MLAs 2019–2024
Chief ministers from Indian National Congress
Indian National Congress politicians
Faculty of Law, University of Delhi alumni
People charged with corruption